QSound is the original name for a positional three-dimensional (3D) sound processing algorithm from QSound Labs that creates 3D audio effects from multiple monophonic sources and sums the outputs to two channels for presentation over regular stereo speakers. QSound was eventually re-dubbed "Q1" after the introduction of "Q2", a positional 3D algorithm for headphones. When multi-speaker surround system support was later added to the positional 3D process, the QSound positional 3D audio process became known simply as "Q3D". QSound was founded by Larry Ryckman (CEO), Danny Lowe and John Lees. Jimmy Iovine served as SVP of Music and Shelly Yakus as VP of Audio Engineering in its formative years.

Technology 

QSound is essentially a filtering algorithm. It manipulates timing, amplitude, and frequency response to produce a binaural image. Systems like QSound rely on the fact that a sound arriving from one side of the listener will reach one ear before the other and that when it reaches the furthest ear, it is lower in amplitude and spectrally altered due to obstruction by the head. However, the ideal algorithm was arrived at empirically, with parameters adjusted according to the outcomes of many listening tests.

3D positional processing like QSound, the multi-channel QSystem professional processor used in the production of pop music and film audio, is distinct from stereo expansion like QSound QXpander or SRS(R) Sound Retrieval System. Positional 3D audio processing is a producer-side technology. It is applied to individual instruments or sound effects, and is therefore only usable at the mixing phase of music and soundtrack production, or under realtime control of game audio mixing software. Stereo expansion (processing of recorded channels and background ambience) is primarily a playback process that can be arbitrarily applied to stereo content in the end-user environment using analog integrated circuits or digital signal processing (DSP) routines.

Adoption 
The system was used in all Capcom CP System Dash, CP System II titles and the Sony ZN-1 and ZN-2 hardware arcade games such as Battle Arena Toshinden 2.

QSound was utilized on Madonna's 1990 album, The Immaculate Collection, Sting's 1991 album, The Soul Cages, Luther Vandross's 1991 album, Power of Love, Paula Abdul's 1991 album, Spellbound, and Roger Waters's 1992 album Amused To Death.

Electronic Arts, Activision, Microsoft Game Studios, Sega, Virgin Interactive, TDK Mediactive, Bullfrog Productions, and Lionhead Studios have also used the technology, mostly through the use of the QMixer software development kit to implement audio positioning, mixing and control directly in the game software. Later versions of QMixer added support for 3D-accelerated hardware through the low-level Microsoft DirectSound3D Application Programming Interface.

Sega started using the technology in 1993 for Sega CD games, beginning with Ecco the Dolphin, and continued the use of this technology for some games through its final home console, the Dreamcast. These consoles, however, did not have the processing power to do so in real-time hardware-wise, so they were instead utilized as pre-recorded tracks that met the Redbook CD standard.

Q3D has been incorporated in a variety of computer sound cards and sound card drivers.

While the system is known by some for its use in video game titles, the first QSound chip used for that purpose was not created until 1991, while QSound had been developed in the late 1980s and has been used in everything from screensavers to television programming. Some TVs were also produced with this technology. Several 1990s music albums were also "mixed in QSound" (see below) using the QSystem or QSystem II hardware processors, and many other music releases have been enhanced with QSound effects using software plug-in versions of the QSystem and other software utilities. (The QSound website maintains a list of known projects.)

In 2003, Q3D was added to the list of components in QSound Labs' microQ, a small-footprint, performance-optimized software digital audio engine aimed at the mobile market (i.e. cellphones and the like). Q3D enables 3D sound for handheld gaming and can be controlled in Java games via the JSR-234 application programming interface.

QSound was also available for general home use in the UltraQ QPC 1500, a hardware device that used RCA connectors to connect to a variety of mono and stereo devices to produce surround-sound like effects.

Awards
QSound won Electronic Entertainments 1993 "Most Promising" award; the editors called it the "hottest new audio technology around".

Selected games using QSound 
(Most arcade games on this list run on the CPS-2 arcade system)
Notable games include:

 1944: The Loop Master (Capcom)
 19XX: The War Against Destiny (Capcom)
 Cyberbots: Full Metal Madness (Capcom)
 D2 (Sega)
 Darkstalkers (Capcom)
 Dungeons & Dragons: Tower of Doom and Dungeons & Dragons: Shadow over Mystara (Capcom)
 Eco Fighters (Capcom)
 Ecco the Dolphin (Sega CD version) (Sega)
 Marvel vs Capcom (Capcom)
 Marvel Super Heroes (Capcom)
 Marvel Super Heroes vs. Street Fighter (Capcom)
 Mega Man: The Power Battle and The Power Fighters (Capcom)
 NiGHTS into Dreams... (Sega)
 Sonic Adventure (Sega)
 Sonic CD (Sega)
 Sonic R (Sega)
 Starship Titanic (Digital Village)
 Street Fighter Alpha series (Capcom)
 Street Fighter EX and Street Fighter EX2 (Arika/Capcom)
 Super Gem Fighter (Capcom)
 Super Puzzle Fighter II Turbo (Capcom)
 Super Street Fighter II (and all variations) (Capcom)
 The Punisher (Capcom)
 The Terminator (Sega CD video game) (Virgin)
 Tetris: The Grand Master (Arika/Capcom)
 X-Men: Children of the Atom (Capcom)
 X-Men vs. Street Fighter (Capcom)
 Zork Nemesis (Activision)

Selected albums "mixed in QSound" 
Over 60 albums feature QSound processing. Some notable examples include:

 The Immaculate Collection by Madonna (1990)
 Power of Love by Luther Vandross (1991)
 Prisoners in Paradise by Europe (1991)
 The Soul Cages by Sting (1991)
 Spellbound by Paula Abdul (1991)
 Help Yourself by Julian Lennon (1991)
 Parallels by Fates Warning (1991)
  Dangerous by Michael Jackson (1991)
 Amused to Death by Roger Waters (1992)
 Whaler by Sophie B. Hawkins (1994)
 A Live One by Phish (1995)
 Pulse by Pink Floyd (1995)
 Broken China by Rick Wright (1996)

Selected films "mixed in QSound" 

 Pink Floyd: Pulse (1995)
 Robin Hood: Prince of Thieves (1991)

See also
Sound Retrieval System
GameCODA
Aureal Semiconductor
Creative Technology
Sensaura

References

External links
QSound Labs website

Sound production technology
Audio enhancement